Javier Sotomayor Sanabria (born 13 October 1967) is a Cuban former track and field athlete who specialized in the high jump and is the current world record holder. The 1992 Olympic champion, he was the dominant high jumper of the 1990s; his personal best of  makes him the only person ever to have cleared eight feet (2.44 m).

Sotomayor is a two-time gold medallist at the IAAF World Championships in Athletics, and also won two silver medals at the competition. At the IAAF World Indoor Championships he won four gold medals between 1989 and 1999. In addition, he won three straight titles at the Pan American Games from 1987 to 1995. He is regarded as the best high jumper of all time. After Cuban boycotts of the Olympics in 1984 and 1988 and an injury in 1996 cost him chances at additional Olympic medals, he won the silver medal at the 2000 Olympics in Sydney. He retired in 2001.

Personal life
Sotomayor was born in Limonar, Matanzas Province on 13 October 1967. The son of a day-care worker and a sugar factory maintenance man, Sotomayor was first sent to a Cuban sports school as a prospective basketball player because of his height. At age 14, coaches made him a high jumper and by 19, he was ranked No. 5 in the world.

Sotomayor is engaged to Amaya Gonzalez, sharing private and professional life. He has four sons. One of his sons, Javier Sotomayor García, has also competed in the high jump.

Early career

World junior record in 1984
He then set the junior world record on 19 May 1984 by clearing  at a meet held in Havana. He was not able to go to Los Angeles, California for the 1984 Olympics due to the boycott by Cuba (and most communist nations).

Career

First world record 1988
However, Sotomayor was again denied the chance to compete in the Olympics in Seoul due to another Cuban boycott of the Olympics. Sotomayor's leap of  broke, by one centimeter, the record of  set the previous summer (30 June 1987) by Sweden's Patrik Sjöberg in Stockholm.

Raises record in 1989 and again in 1993
The July 1989 record of 2.44 m, which he cleared on his second attempt, was a historic jump for Imperial-measure fans, as that was the first jump over 8 feet.

He missed much of the 1990 outdoor season after surgery to remove scar tissue in his knee and heel. Afterwards he said, "My physical condition is better, but psychologically I am not well prepared."

Videos of his record-setting leap show his unique, galloping approach with two elongated strides in the middle of his 14-step run, and a powerful left leg take-off as he pumps both of his arms: he begins his approach with three short steps, builds up speed, then takes exaggerated strides on steps 8 and 9, and then re-accelerates over his last five strides.

After setting the record in Salamanca, Sotomayor told reporters, "I wanted to set the record here because it is a small city in which I feel like I am in Cuba. The people recognize me in the street and ask how I'm doing, the children surround me and I find myself in a good mental state."

World indoor record in 1989

He broke the record during the 1989 IAAF World Indoor Championships, clearing  on his first attempt (and fifth jump overall). At this competition, Sotomayor was one of four men to clear , at which point he stood in third place, trailing Dietmar Mögenburg (Germany) and Dalton Grant (Great Britain) who each succeeded on their first attempts, while Sotomayor and Patrik Sjöberg (Sweden) each needed two tries.

Olympic champion in 1992
When he was finally able to compete in the Summer Olympics he won the gold medal at the 1992 Olympics and then the silver medal at the 2000 Olympics (after the reversal of a drug suspension for drug usage). Between the games he won the 1993 and 1997 World Championship.

At the Barcelona Olympics, Sotomayor won the high jump on the basis of his ability to jump "clean" (no misses) at the highest height. All five competitors then failed at the next height, . Sotomayor was declared the victor on the basis of the tie-breaker: Patrik Sjöberg (Sweden) won the silver medal having cleared 2.34 on his second attempt, while Artur Partyka (Poland), Tim Forsyth (Australia) and Hollis Conway (USA) tied for the bronze medal.

Indoor and outdoor world champion in 1993
He outjumped the competition, establishing a new World Championships record of : the second-place jumper, Artur Partyka (Poland) jumped 2.37.

The last time he would clear  was on 25 March 1995 at the Pan American Games in Mar del Plata, Argentina. A healthy Sotomayor attempted to defend his title at the 1995 World Championships, held in Gothenburg, Sweden. Partyka finished third, at 2.35.

1996 outdoor season
Sotomayor had a good start to 1996 during the indoor season, but was plagued by injury during the outdoor season. At the 1996 Summer Olympics he attempted to defend his Olympic title in Atlanta. His  clearance left him in equal 11th position.

Sotomayor underwent treatment for knee and heel injuries after his poor showing in the Atlanta Olympics and skipped the 1997 indoor season. He began training in Puerto Rico in spring 1997 for the outdoor season, but Cuban sports officials announced on 30 May 1997 that although Sotomayor was "in good form", he was withdrawing from the season's first big meet in Toronto and would instead make his season debut the following week at a track meet in France.

1999 Pan American Games
Sotomayor won the gold medal at the 1999 Pan American Games, held in Winnipeg. Just a few days after his victory, Games officials announced that his urine test tested positive for an illegal drug, cocaine (a stimulant), and on 4 August he was stripped of his medal and was sent home to Cuba in disgrace. At the time, this was widely regarded as the biggest drug scandal in the sport of track and field in over a decade (since Canadian sprinter Ben Johnson was stripped of his gold medal at the 1988 Seoul Olympics). In 1999 Sotomayor was a national celebrity, a well-known anti-drug crusader and the pride of Cuba's sports system. Mario Granda, Cuba's chief of sports medicine, reacted to the shocking news by saying the 31-year-old Sotomayor had "passed more than 60 drug tests" in his career and suggested that Sotomayor was the victim of sabotage.

2000 Olympics in Sydney
Sotomayor was allowed to participate in the 2000 Summer Olympics in Sydney despite his two-year drug suspension from 1999. His suspension was upheld in June 2000, but in August the IAAF cut the penalty in half – effectively to time served – and allowed him to compete at Sydney at the age of 32. The finals of the men's high jump were held on Sunday September 24, in rainy, windy conditions which worsened as the event progressed. The wet surface greatly impacted the results. Seven men cleared  before the light rain began to worsen, and Russian Sergey Klyugin was the only jumper able to clear the next height, doing so before the rain and wind peaked. The favorite to win the competition, Vyacheslav Voronin (Russia) managed to clear only  in the rain, after having cleared  one month before. Another medal favorite, Stefan Holm (Sweden), finished fourth and complained that the IAAF should not have reduced Sotomayor's two-year suspension.

Dominating career

Sotomayor has a rare dominance in the history of this event. At the time he retired he had 17 of the top 20 jumps of all time. Only 13 men in history have jumped 2.40 metres or higher, and only 5 have done it more than once. Sotomayor did it 24 times (in 21 different competitions between September 1988 – March 1995). He is the only person to have cleared  (which he did twice). Besides dominating the event on the Grand Prix circuit, Sotomayor recorded wins at the Goodwill Games in St Petersburg on 29 July, and at the World Cup in London on 11 September, where his best jump of 2.40 m was a record 12 centimeters above the next-best performance. The last time he would clear 2.40 meters was on March 25, 1995, at the Pan American Games in Mar del Plata, Argentina. Only Bohdan Bondarenko and Mutaz Essa Barshim have jumped higher outdoors since, although four men equaled the mark.

During his career, Sotomayor was ranked by Track & Field News in the "Top 10" in the men's high jump in ten different years, and was ranked #1 eight of those ten years: in 1988, 89, 1992, 93, 94, 95, 97 and 1998. By comparison, the jumper with second-most #1 rankings over a career is Russian Valeriy Brumel in five consecutive years (1961–65). For his career Sotomayor accumulated 123 ranking points, while the jumper with the second-most career points, American Dwight Stones has 90 points and four consecutive #1 rankings (1973–76.)

Drug tests
Sotomayor tested positive for cocaine at the 1999 Pan American Games, which Cuban president Fidel Castro claimed was a set-up by the Cuban-American Mafia. Sotomayor claimed his innocence. After months of hearings, an IAAF arbitration panel upheld the two-year ban on June 27, 2000. The Cuban federation continued to appeal his case, citing a clause in the IAAF rulebook that allows drug bans to be modified under "exceptional circumstances". In a controversial decision announced on August 2, the IAAF shortened the suspension to one year – which had elapsed on July 30 – thereby allowing him to compete in the 2000 Summer Olympics. IAAF's motivation for this action was that Sotomayor had done a great deal for the sport, had passed hundreds of drug tests during his long career, and acted exemplarily throughout. Four days later he won a Golden League meet held in Monaco by clearing . Interviewed on French television immediately after his victory, Sotomayor said: "I was not fantastic today. I was very tired because I have been practicing a lot, and I also have a new baby since July, which is another reason why I'm a little tired. But I should be able to clear 2.36 or 2.37 at the Olympics. I just hope nobody else does 2.40."

End of career
In September 2001, Sotomayor announced that he would end his career, following another positive drug test during a training camp in June, this time for the anabolic steroid nandrolone. He avoided a lifetime ban that would normally follow a second positive test. This second test disqualified his fourth-place finish in his last World Championship. Once again, Sotomayor claimed he was innocent and that mistakes had been made during the handling of his doping test.

These allegations never gained strong support in his home country Cuba, although former IAAF Vice President and Doping Commission Chairman Arne Ljungqvist asserted these were both "crystal clear cases" in a Swedish interview.

In a February 2004 interview for Cuban news, Sotomayor said that injury had forced his retirement, not the doping scandal. An Achilles tendon problem hampered his performance, he said, and reduced his run-up from nine steps to seven and then just five.

Competition record

See also
 List of doping cases in athletics

References

External links
 
 
 
 
  
 

1967 births
Living people
People from Matanzas Province
Cuban male high jumpers
Cuban sportspeople in doping cases
World Athletics record holders
World Athletics indoor record holders
Olympic athletes of Cuba
Athletes (track and field) at the 1992 Summer Olympics
Athletes (track and field) at the 1996 Summer Olympics
Athletes (track and field) at the 2000 Summer Olympics
Olympic gold medalists for Cuba
Olympic silver medalists for Cuba
Athletes (track and field) at the 1987 Pan American Games
Athletes (track and field) at the 1991 Pan American Games
Athletes (track and field) at the 1995 Pan American Games
Athletes (track and field) at the 1999 Pan American Games
Doping cases in athletics
World Athletics Championships medalists
Medalists at the 2000 Summer Olympics
Medalists at the 1992 Summer Olympics
Pan American Games gold medalists for Cuba
Olympic gold medalists in athletics (track and field)
Olympic silver medalists in athletics (track and field)
Pan American Games medalists in athletics (track and field)
Universiade medalists in athletics (track and field)
Goodwill Games medalists in athletics
Central American and Caribbean Games gold medalists for Cuba
Competitors at the 1990 Central American and Caribbean Games
Competitors at the 1993 Central American and Caribbean Games
Competitors at the 1998 Central American and Caribbean Games
Universiade gold medalists for Cuba
World Athletics Indoor Championships medalists
World Athletics Indoor Championships winners
World Athletics Championships winners
Central American and Caribbean Games medalists in athletics
Medalists at the 1989 Summer Universiade
Competitors at the 1998 Goodwill Games
Competitors at the 1994 Goodwill Games
Medalists at the 1987 Pan American Games
Medalists at the 1991 Pan American Games
Medalists at the 1995 Pan American Games
Medalists at the 1999 Pan American Games
World Athletics U20 Championships winners
Friendship Games medalists in athletics